The following outline is provided as an overview of motorcycles and motorcycling:

Motorcycle — two-wheeled, single-track motor vehicle. Other names include: motorbike, bike, and cycle.

Motorcycling — act of riding a motorcycle, around which a variety of subcultures and lifestyles have built up.

Motorcycles

Description
 Legal definition of motorcycle – a 'powered two-wheel motor vehicle'. Scooters do not count as a separate category, and are deemed to be "motorcycles". 
 Some motorcycles have paired front wheels, or paired rear wheels, three in all. Motorized tricycles and sidecar outfits are deemed "motorcycles".  Most jurisdictions do not consider three-wheeled cars to be motorcycles; but some (including the UK) grant low tax and driving licence exemptions to such vehicles subject to, say, weight and power limits.
 Motorcycles can be described as all of the following:
 a component of transport
 a component of a mode of transport
 a component of road transport
 a type of vehicle
 a type of motor vehicle
 a type of machine
 sports equipment

Types

Types of motorcycles
The design of a motorcycle reflects the purpose for which it is to be used.  The main types of motorcycle include:

Street motorcycle – designed for riding on paved roads; features smooth tyres with a light tread pattern and at least  engine.
Cruiser – mimics the style of American machines from the 1930s to the early 1960s, including those made by Harley-Davidson, Indian, Excelsior and Henderson; models evocative of the early cruisers make up 60% of the U.S. market
Bobber – usually has had the front fender removed, the rear fender 'bobbed' or made smaller, and all superfluous items removed to make it lighter
Chopper – has a longer frame design accompanied by a stretched front end (or rake). To achieve a longer front end, while the frame is being designed, the fabricator tilts the neck of the frame at less of an incline and installs a longer fork.
Sport bike – optimised for speed, acceleration, braking, and cornering on paved roads, typically at the expense of comfort and fuel economy in comparison to less specialised motorcycles.
Café racer – a type of motorcycle that has been modified for speed and good handling rather than comfort. Cafe racers' bodywork and control layout typically mimic the style of Grand Prix roadracers of the 1950s or 1960s with or without fairings. They tend to feature an elongated fuel tank, a small, rearward mounted and humped single seat, and low, race style handlebars mounted on the front forks.
Streetfighter – a sport bike that is customised by removing the fairing, with other changes that result in an overall more aggressive look
Touring motorcycle – designed for long-distance touring and heavy commuting; although any motorcycle can be ridden to tour or commute, manufacturers provide specific models designed to address these particular needs
Sport touring motorcycle – blends performance with long-distance capabilities while providing comfort and relative safety to the rider, and tend  to include accessories, such as a trunk or saddlebags for storage, to enhance the touring experience
Standard motorcycle – versatile, general purpose street motorcycle, with an upright riding position.
Universal Japanese Motorcycle – Japanese motorcycle with a transverse air-cooled four-cylinder engine in a conventional tube frame with a dual seat, mostly made in the 1970s and early 1980s
Custom motorcycle – unique or individually produced in a very limited quantity, as opposed to stock bikes which are mass-produced. Is usually highly stylised or has an unusual frame geometry or engine design. Many styles including café racer, streetfighter, and chopper began as customized motorcycles before manufacturers mass-produced bikes styled after popular custom machines.
Rat bike – motorcycle maintained at little to no cost, or often of a deliberately exaggerated state of disrepair
Dual-sport motorcycle – type of street-legal motorcycle designed for both on and off-road use
Enduro motorcycle – motorcycle made specifically for the Enduro sport, with the long travel and medium-hard suspension of a motocross bike enhanced with motorcycle features such as a headlight and quiet muffler to make the bike street-legal for parts of the track
Motocross motorcycle – a light weight, high power, off-road competition race bike
Supermoto motorcycle – a dual purpose, single cylinder, light weight bike fitted with equipment better suited to street riding or racing such as 18 inch front wheel and road tyres
Off-road motorcycle
Motocross motorcycle
Track racing motorcycle – customised for track racing, with no brakes and fueled with methanol
Trials motorcycle – an extremely lightweight design, that lacks seating (designed to be ridden standing up) and that has suspension travel that is short, relative to a motocross or enduro motorcycle

Small class
Minibike – sometimes called a mini-moto or pocket-bike, it is a considerably smaller motorcycle; most traditional minibikes use a two stroke engine to turn the rear wheel via a chain
Mini chopper – mini choppers are scaled-down versions of choppers, and are usually constructed from 1" steel tubing or 3/4" steel black pipe; the tube or pipe is bent and then welded together to get the desired angles and shapes of the frame, which is usually custom made
Moped – a type of low-powered motorcycle designed to provide economical and relatively safe transport with minimal licensing requirements
Sport moped – a type of moped that resembles a sport bike
Pit bike – a small off-road motorcycle originally used for riding around the pits or staging area of a motocross race; since the early 2000s, pit bike racing, a sport similar to motocross, has become popular in the United States, especially in Southern California
Scooter – a step-through motorcycle with a seat, a floorboard, and small or low wheels. Most modern scooter designs have swingarm-mounted engines
Underbone – a step-through motorcycle with a structural down-tube and conventionally sized wheels, but without a floorboard
Electric motorcycle – has an electric motor powered by one or more batteries or fuel cells
Electric dragbike
TTXGP race class
TT Zero race class
Enclosed motorcycle
Cabin motorcycle
Streamliner motorcycle
Utility motorcycle
Derny – motorised bicycle for motor-paced cycling events
Blood bike
Fire bike
Motocrotte – Parisian sanitation motorcycle
Motorcycle ambulance
Motorcycle taxi
Police motorcycle
Other designs and variations
Feet forwards motorcycle – motorcycle on which the rider reclines with his feet positioned ahead of his body
Related three-wheeled vehicles
Auto rickshaw
Motorcycle combination
Motorized tricycle
Tilting three-wheeler

Design

Motorcycle design
Motorcycle dynamics
Shaft effect
Motorcycle geometry
Motorcycle testing and measurement

Major component parts

Motorcycle components
Motorcycle brakes
Anti-lock braking system – fitted to many modern motorcycles
Combined braking system – links front and rear brake operation
Motorcycle chassis – includes the frame and suspension, along with the front forks, of the vehicle.
Motorcycle frame – provides the strength and rigidity of the motorcycle; all other parts are attached directly or indirectly to the frame
Suspension – controls the ride and handling of the motorcycle by controlling the rate and distance of the movement of the wheels relative to the frame
Motorcycle fork – acts as suspension for the front wheel and allows the motorcycle to be steered
Motorcycle engine – provides the power to propel the motorcycle
Forced induction in motorcycles – turbocharger or supercharger for greater power per unit displacement
Motorcycle transmission
Chain drive – the most common method of transferring power from the engine to the wheels
Shaft drive – low-maintenance alternative to chain drive, favoured by certain manufacturers, such as BMW Motorrad and Moto Guzzi, and also used on many large touring motorcycles
Belt drive – low-maintenance alternative to chain drive, favoured by certain manufacturers, such as Harley-Davidson, and on many cruiser motorcycles
Motorcycle handlebar
Instrument panel
Speedometer – indicates the forward speed of the motorcycle
Odometer – records and indicates the total distance travelled by the motorcycle
Tachometer – indicates the rotational speed of the crankshaft in the engine, often also shows an indicated safe limit called a redline
Fuel gauge – indicates the amount of fuel in the tank relative to tank capacity
Motorcycle saddle
Motorcycle tyres – have a round cross section to facilitate the leaning necessary when a motorcycle turns
Motorcycle wheels
Motorcycle accessories
Motorcycle fairing
Motorcycle headlamp modulator
Sidecar
Storage accessories
Pannier
Saddlebags
Motorcycle trailer
Trunk

Models
:Category:Lists of motorcycles
:Category:Lists of motorcycles of the United Kingdom
List of Grand Prix motorcycles

Manufacturers
List of motorcycle manufacturers

History

Motorcycle history
Motorcycle land speed record
List of fastest production motorcycles
History of electric motorcycles and scooters

Pioneers

First motorcycle ride – it is generally accepted that the first motorcycle ride was by Gottlieb Daimler's son Paul on a new machine called Einspur ('one track') near Stuttgart in Germany on 10 November 1885.  However, several pioneering engineers and inventors preceded Daimler, mostly with steam engines powering their cycles.  These include:
Lucius Copeland – 19th-century engineer and inventor from Phoenix who demonstrated one of the first motorcycles in 1884
Louis-Guillaume Perreaux – French inventor and engineer who submitted one of the first patents for a working motorcycle in 1869, the Michaux-Perreaux steam velocipede.

Many pioneering engineers and inventors followed Daimler in using internal combustion engines . These include:
Siegfried Bettmann – founder of the Triumph Motorcycle Company
Oscar Hedstrom – designer and engineer who designed the Indian motorcycle, one of the first motorcycles manufactured in the United States
Edward Pennington – pioneering motorcycle inventor credited with having invented the word 'motorcycle' and using the term as early as 1893
Alfred Angas Scott – motorcycle designer, inventor and founder of the Scott Motorcycle Company

Innovators
Max Friz – German mechanical engineer and contributor of engine design that led to the founding of BMW in 1917
Harry Ricardo – pioneering motorcycle engine designer influential in the early years of the development of the internal combustion engine
Edward Turner – motorcycle designer and General Manager of Triumph where he led the development of many important technical ideas found on motorcycles today
John Britten – New Zealand mechanical engineer who designed a world-record-setting motorcycle with innovative features and materials
Mike Tomkinson - motorcycle engineer whose Bol d'Or endurance racers incorporated numerous innovative features.
David Garside - BSA engineer who developed the F&S  Wankel into a powerful Norton motorcycle engine.

Industrialists
George Brough – world record holding motorcycle racer and founder of Brough Superior motorcycles
Arthur Davidson – co-founder of the Harley-Davidson Motor Company
Eugene Goodman – co founder of the Velocette motorcycle company with his father John Goodman in 1913
William S. Harley – co-founder of the Harley-Davidson Motor Company
Soichiro Honda – founder of the Honda Motor Company
Bert Hopwood – a British motorcycle designer who influenced development of the British motorcycle industry and worked for Ariel, Norton, BSA and Triumph
Frantisek Janeček – founder of the Czech Jawa Motors
James Lansdowne Norton – motorcycle designer, inventor and manufacturer of the Norton motorcycles
Val Page – motorcycle designer and worked for most of the leading marques, including Ariel, Triumph and BSA
Jack Sangster – industrialist who became an important figure in the history of the British motorcycle industry
Phil Vincent – founder of Vincent Motorcycles, his designs influenced the development of motorcycles around the world

Museums and exhibitions
There are a number of museums which feature collections of motorcycles, either as part of a larger exhibition of vehicles, or dedicated entirely to motorcycles.  Some of those museums are listed below:
Barber Vintage Motorsports Museum
Deutsches Zweirad- und NSU-Museum
Evel Knievel Museum
Harley-Davidson Museum
Honda Collection Hall
Irbit State Motorcycle Museum
Moto Guzzi Museum
Motorcycle Hall of Fame
National Motorcycle Museum (Anamosa, IA)
National Motor Museum, Beaulieu
List of motorcycles in the National Motor Museum, Beaulieu
National Motorcycle Museum (UK)
Sammy Miller Motorcycle Museum
The Art of the Motorcycle
List of motorcycles in The Art of the Motorcycle exhibition
List of motorcycles in the Smithsonian Institution

Motorcycling

Motorcycling
Motorcycling advocacy
Motorcycle lane

Safety
Motorcycle safety
Countersteering
Hurt Report
Lane splitting
MAIDS report
Motorcycle training

Equipment
Motorcycle personal protective equipment
Motorcycle helmet
Motorcycle boots
Motorcycle armor

Accidents
Lowsider
Highsider
Motorcycle deaths in U.S. by year
List of deaths by motorcycle accident

Types
Motorcycle commuting
Courier service by motorcycle
Motorcycle rally
Sweep
Motorcycle touring
Trail riding – riding outdoors on natural trails and roads.

Sport

Motorcycle sport – broad field that encompasses all sporting aspects of motorcycling. The various disciplines are not all races or timed-speed events, as several disciplines test a competitor's various riding skills. Riders have raced motorcycles for over a hundred years, with the first official competition recorded as the Paris–Rouen race in July 1894. This was quickly followed by races all over Europe and the US. Motorcycle sport now takes many different forms, including:
Enduro
Freestyle Motocross
Land speed record – a single rider accelerates over a 1- to 3-mile (4.8 km) long straight track (usually on dry lake beds) and is timed for top speed through a trap at the end of the run. The rider must exceed the previous top speed record for that class or type of bike for their name to be placed on the record books.
Motorcycle land speed record
Motoball (Motorcycle Polo) – similar to football, but all players (except goalkeepers) ride motorcycles, and the ball is much bigger.
Motorcycle trials
Motorcycle stunt riding
Wheelie
Stoppie
Burnout
:Category:Motorcycle sport lists

Racing
Motorcycle racing – motorcycle sport involving racing motorcycles, on or off a track.
Motorcycle drag racing
Pro Stock Motorcycle
Road racing
Grand Prix motorcycle racing
Superbike racing
Isle of Man TT
TTXGP
North West 200
Ulster Grand Prix
Motocross
Motocross World Championship
Motocross des Nations
AMA Motocross Championship
Trans-AMA Motocross Championship
AMA Supercross Championship
Pit bike racing – competition sport similar to motocross, using pit bikes
Track racing
Motorcycle speedway
Speedway Grand Prix
Speedway World Cup
SGB Premiership
AMA Grand National Championship
Grasstrack
Ice speedway
Enduro
World Enduro Championship
International Six Days Enduro
Grand National Cross Country
Erzberg Rodeo
Red Bull Romaniacs Hard Enduro Rallye
Endurocross
Motorcycle trials
FIM Trial World Championship
Motorcycle land-speed record - Encapsulating the sport of Motorcycle Land Speed Racing
Bonneville Speedway - Location of the Southern California Timing Association Speed Week, USFRA World of Speed and Bonneville Motorcycle Speed Trials
El Mirage Lake - San Bernardino County, California
Lake Gairdner - Australia

Organisations and clubs

Although motorcycling can be a solitary form of transport, there are clubs for almost every aspect; including charities, social clubs, criminal or outlaw clubs, lobby groups that guard against restrictive legislation, and specialist clubs for specific makes or types of motorcycle.  Examples include:

Organisations

American Motorcyclist Association (AMA)
British Motorcyclists Federation (BMF) – a UK-based campaigner and lobby group for motorcyclists' rights
Fédération Internationale de Motocyclisme (FIM) – the worldwide body responsible for governing motorcycle sport
State motorcyclists' rights organizations – 32 organisations in the U.S., 25 of which are known as ABATE, which were initially formed to fight motorcycle helmet laws

Motorcycle clubs
Motorcycle club – group of individuals whose primary interest and activities involve motorcycles.
List of Motorcycle Club terms
List of motorcycle clubs – examples of motorcycle clubs include:
Antique Motorcycle Club of America
BMW Motorcycle Owners of America – a single marque club for owners of BMW motorcycles
Freewheelers EVS – a UK-based club whose members volunteer to transport blood between hospitals
Harley Owners Group – a worldwide club run by Harley-Davidson for owners of its motorcycles
Patriot Guard Riders – formed in 2005 to provide an honour guard at the funerals of repatriated military personnel in the U.S.
List of outlaw motorcycle clubs
Hells Angels – a worldwide outlaw motorcycle club founded in 1948

Notable motorcyclists

Sonny Barger – Hells Angel
Marlon Brando – actor
Peter Fonda – actor, star of Easy Rider
Malcolm Forbes – capitalist, leader of the first group of foreigners permitted to tour Soviet Union by motorcycle
Che Guevara – revolutionary, inspired by witnessing peasants' living conditions during 8,000 km ride across South America
Harry Hurt – safety researcher and author of the Hurt Report
T. E. Lawrence – Lawrence of Arabia
Jay Leno – talk show host, rare motorcycle collector
Ewan McGregor – actor, marathon international motorcycle trips
Steve McQueen – actor and motorcycle racer and collector
Ted Simon – British journalist known for circumnavigating the world by motorcycle and for documenting his journey in the book Jupiter's Travels
Bessie Stringfield – early black woman motorcyclist and long distance rider
Hunter S. Thompson – author and journalist
Van Buren sisters – first women to ride across the U.S. in 1916

Notable motorcycle sportspersons

Giacomo Agostini – Grand Prix motorcycle racer, winner of fifteen World Championship titles and 122 Grand Prix race wins
Erwin 'Cannonball' Baker – US promotional rider known for setting transcontinental speed records on motorcycles and in cars in the early 20th century
Toni Bou – winner of thirteen trial World Championship titles
Ricky Carmichael – very successful motocross racer
Geoff Duke – Grand Prix motorcycle racer, winner of six World Championship titles, and the first racer to wear a one-piece leather racing suit
Joey Dunlop – motorcycle racer who won 26 races at the Isle of Man Tourist Trophy meets
Bud Ekins – stunt rider and stunt coordinator 
Stefan Everts – winner of ten FIM Motocross World Championship titles
Carl Fogarty – superbike racer, four-time World Superbike champion
Mike Hailwood – Grand Prix motorcycle racer, winner of 9 World Championship titles and 14 Isle of Man TT races; first to win 3 races at one IoM TT, in 1961 (125 cc, 250 cc, and 500 cc)
Ernst Jakob Henne – a German motorcycle racer in the 1920s
Aleš Hlad, Slovenian supermoto racer, 2005 European Champion and winner of the 2007 Athens GP 
Dougie Lampkin  – winner of twelve trial World Championship titles
Mary McGee -first woman to officially race motorcycles
John McGuinness successful road racer at the Isle of Man TT, the North West 200, the Macau Grand Prix and the Bol d'Or.
Guy Martin -  an English motorcycle racer and television personality.
Sammy Miller, MBE – motorcycle sportsperson, museum collector, patron of the National Association for Bikers with a Disability (NABD)
Evel Knievel – stunt rider known for jumping motorcycles over tall, long, or otherwise dangerous obstacles; and for multiple injuries from bad landings
Phil Read - motorcycle racer who successfully competed in MotoGPs, the Isle of Man TT and in Bol d'Or endurance races.
Valentino Rossi – Grand Prix motorcycle racer, winner of nine World Championship titles and 111 Grand Prix races
Kenny Roberts – first American to win a motorcycle Grand Prix, winner of the AMA Grand Slam, racing team owner and safety advocate
Juha Salminen – winner of thirteen World Enduro Championship titles
Barry Sheene – Grand Prix motorcycle racer, winner of three World Championship titles
John Surtees – Grand Prix motorcycle racer, winner of seven World Championship titles; the only racer to have won world championship titles on both two and four wheels
Mick Doohan – Grand Prix motorcycle racer, winner of five World Championship titles
Kari Tiainen – winner of seven World Enduro Championship titles

Motocross riders
List of Motocross riders

Motorcycling in the media

Film

The Wild One – the influence of motorcycle movies can be traced to this movie starring Marlon Brando in 1954 which helped to turn motorcycling into a rebellious lifestyle culture which US censor boards allowed 'with caution', but in the United Kingdom, the film was banned by the British Board of Film Censors for fourteen years. It finally got an 'X' certificate in November, 1967. Other influential motorcycle movies include:
Easy Rider
Electra Glide in Blue
On Any Sunday
No Limit
Silver Dream Racer
The Girl on a Motorcycle
The Great Escape
The Leather Boys
The Motorcycle Diaries
The World's Fastest Indian
TT3D: Closer to the Edge
Beyond The Law

Television programmes
American Chopper
CHiPs
Feasting on Asphalt
Full Throttle Saloon
Long Way Round and Long Way Down
Sons of Anarchy
Street Hawk
Then Came Bronson

Documentaries
Hard Miles and Hard Miles 2

Books
Ghost Rider: Travels on the Healing Road by Neil Peart
Hell's Angels: The Strange and Terrible Saga of the Outlaw Motorcycle Gangs by Hunter S. Thompson
Jupiter's Travels by Ted Simon
The Motorcycle Diaries by Che Guevara
Three-Wheeling Through Africa by James C. Wilson
Zen and the Art of Motorcycle Maintenance by Robert M. Pirsig

Exhibitions
The Art of the Motorcycle Solomon R. Guggenheim Museum and others

References

External links

Global motorcycle sales statistics

Inline motorcycles

Motorcycles
Motorcycles